Fairfield Municipal Airport may refer to:

 Fairfield Municipal Airport (Iowa) in Fairfield, Iowa, United States (FAA: FFL)
 Fairfield Municipal Airport (Illinois) in Fairfield, Illinois, United States (FAA: FWC)

See also
 Fairfield Airport (disambiguation)
 Fairfield County Airport (disambiguation)